Prince is a 2011 Indian Kannada action drama film starring Darshan, Nikita Thukral and Jennifer Kotwal in the lead roles. The film has been directed and written by Om Prakash Rao  and produced by Sandesh Nagaraj under Sandesh Combines.The music of the film was composed by V. Harikrishna. The movie is a remake of the 2006 Telugu film Shock.

Plot

A witty young man, Vishuvardhan (Darshan) is in love with Anjali (Nikita Thukral). All hell breaks loose when Anjali is murdered while she is pregnant and Vishuvardhan's hunt for the killer leads him to commit a cop's murder.

Cast

Soundtrack
The music was composed by V. Harikrishna and released by Anand Audio Video.

Reception

Critical response 

A critic from The Times of India scored the film at 3 out of 5 stars and wrote "While Darshan has done justice to the role, Nikhita, who begins on a glamorous note stirs out a good performance. Venus Murthya's cinematography fails to impress". Shruti Indira Lakshminarayana from Rediff.com scored the film at 1.5 out of 5 stars and says "Om and Darshan have given entertaining films like Ayya and Kalasipalya. However, they disappoint with Prince. But then again you can't say they didn't warn you as their film posters read Prince… 'The stupid fellow'!". BSS from Deccan Herald wrote "if only for the chase in the climax. Using the thespians’ names and their cutouts are mere ruses.  A ‘different’ revenge story whose origins are numerous and confusing, Prince is strictly for Darshan and Omprakash Rao fans". A critic from Bangalore Mirror wrote  " If only the director had paid more attention to the nuances and intricacies. To sum up, an effort gone awry, a far cry from Rao’s previous work Huli, a technically-perfect flick".

References

2011 films
2010s Kannada-language films
Films set in Bangalore
Films scored by V. Harikrishna
Films directed by Om Prakash Rao
Indian films about revenge
Kannada remakes of Telugu films